The list of educational institutions located in Secunderabad are:

St. Ann's High School, Secunderabad, established in 1871
St. Patrick's High School, Secunderabad, established in 1911
St. Mary's High School, Secunderabad, established in 1885
Panchavati High School
St. Andrew's High School
St John's Church High School
St. Thomas (SPG) Boys' High School
Kasturba Gandhi College for Women
Tapasya College of Commerce and Management
Nizam College
Mahbub College High School
Seventh Day Adventist High School, Secunderabad
Gandhi Medical College
Mother Teresa High School, R.K.Puram, established in 1999.  

Engineering colleges on Secunderabad:

Swami Vivekananda Institute of Technology

Secunderabad
Secunderabad schools

Secunderabad